Sayreville Station is a neighborhood in Sayreville in Middlesex County, New Jersey, United States. Originally terminus of Raritan River Railroad's Sayreville Branch between Upper and Lower Sayreville. The spur was abandoned in 1978.

See also
List of neighborhoods in Sayreville, New Jersey

References

Neighborhoods in Sayreville, New Jersey